Sir Gilbert Heathcote, 4th Baronet (6 October 1773 – 26 March 1851) of Normanton Park, Rutland, was a British Member of Parliament.

Heathcote was the son of Sir Gilbert Heathcote, 3rd Baronet, by his second wife Elizabeth, daughter of Robert Hudson. He succeeded as fourth Baronet on his father's death in 1785.

His principal seat was Normanton Park where he held considerable property, augmented by further large holdings north of the Grimsthorpe Estate in Kesteven.

In 1795 he was appointed High Sheriff of Rutland and in 1796 he was elected to the House of Commons for Lincolnshire as a Whig, a seat he held until 1807, before representing Rutland from 1812 to 1841.

Heathcote married firstly Lady Katherine Sophia Manners, eldest daughter of John Manners and Louisa, Countess of Dysart, in 1793. After his first wife's death in 1825 he remarried the same year. Heathcote died in March 1851, aged 77, and was succeeded in the baronetcy by his son, Gilbert, who in 1856 was elevated to the peerage as Baron Aveland.

Heathcote was for many years a senior steward of Epsom Downs Racecourse, which adjoined his home at The Durdans. His horse Amato won The Derby in 1838.

References

External links 
 

1773 births
1851 deaths
Baronets in the Baronetage of Great Britain
Gilbert
High Sheriffs of Rutland
Masters of foxhounds in England
Members of the Parliament of Great Britain for English constituencies
British MPs 1796–1800
Members of the Parliament of the United Kingdom for English constituencies
UK MPs 1801–1802
UK MPs 1802–1806
UK MPs 1812–1818
UK MPs 1818–1820
UK MPs 1820–1826
UK MPs 1826–1830
UK MPs 1830–1831
UK MPs 1831–1832
UK MPs 1832–1835
UK MPs 1835–1837
UK MPs 1837–1841